Sanna Pakirappa or Sanna Pakkirappa (born 21 September 1958) is an Indian politician and was a member of 15th Lok Sabha from Raichur constituency. He is cousin of B Sriramulu. He contested from Bellary Rural in 2018 Karnataka Assembly Election.

Political career
Pakirappa is member of Bharatiya Janata Party. He was elected to 15th Lok Sabha from Raichur constituency, Karnataka in 2009.

Positions held

References

India MPs 2009–2014
1958 births
Living people
Lok Sabha members from Karnataka
Bharatiya Janata Party politicians from Karnataka